Sir Theophilus Biddulph, 1st Baronet (1612 – 25 March 1683) was the son of Michael Biddulph of Elmhurst, Staffordshire.

He was a London Silkman who was knighted in 1660 and created a baronet in the Baronetage of England on 2 November 1664. His residence was Westcombe Manor, Greenwich, Kent.

He was Member of Parliament for London 1656–1659 and for Lichfield, Staffordshire 1661–1679.

He is mentioned in the diary of Samuel Pepys for 1664–5.

He died at Greenwich aged 72, and was buried 14 April 1683 at Stow Church, Lichfield and was succeeded by his son Michael. His brother Michael was also MP for Lichfield.

References

Notes

1612 births
1683 deaths
Baronets in the Baronetage of England
People from Elmhurst, Staffordshire
English MPs 1661–1679
English MPs 1656–1658
English MPs 1659